The coat of arms of Maastricht is a symbol of the city of Maastricht, Limburg, The Netherlands.

See also
Flag of Maastricht

References

Sources
 Sierksma, Klaes (1968): De gemeentewapens van Nederland. Utrecht: Het Spectrum 
 Zicht op Maastricht: Stadwapen 
 Wapen: Gemeente Maastricht

External links

Maastricht
Culture in Maastricht
Maastricht
Maastricht